The Eurobest Festival of Creativity (formerly the European Advertising Festival) is an annual event which celebrates and rewards "creative excellence" in creative communications, advertising and related fields in Europe.

The first Festival took place in Stockholm, Sweden, in December 2008, based on the Eurobest Awards, which were launched in 1988. It regularly moves to different host cities; in 2009, it took place in November at the Beurs van Berlage in Amsterdam, the Netherlands. In 2010, it takes place between 7 and 8 December in Hamburg, Germany.

In 2011, it was established the Festival would take place for three years at Cinema Sao Jorge in Lisbon. The third Eurobest in Lisbon took place from 4–6 December 2013.

In 2017, the Festival took place in London, United Kingdom.

The Festival is organised by the Cannes Lions International Festival of Creativity, owned by British publisher and conference organiser Ascential.

The Awards

Started in 1988, the Eurobest Awards honour creativity over 14 different entry sections: PR, Film, Print, Outdoor, Direct, Promo & Activation, Media, Interactive, Mobile, Radio, Design, Craft, Integrated and Branded Content & Entertainment.

Every year, all the work entered into the Awards is judged at the Eurobest Festival by panels of expert, high-profile jurors. They decide on an initial shortlist and then on which pieces should earn Grand Prix, Gold, Silver and Bronze trophies.

Winners are revealed each year at the Eurobest Awards Ceremony, which concludes the Festival.

The Festival

Through a programme of seminars, workshops and events, sessions provide space for the industry to debate and be inspired by the latest thinking. They attract the continent’s community of art directors, copywriters, media agency executives, clients, account managers, agency heads, producers and directors.

In 2009, speakers at the event included creatives from Taxi, Crispin Porter + Bogusky, Facebook, Adidas, 180 Amsterdam, Microsoft Advertising, Tribal DDB, Wieden + Kennedy, Glue, Spotify, Leo Burnett, Naked, Hyper Island, AKQA, McDonald's and Wired.

For 2010, speakers include Bob Greenberg (R/GA Global Chief Creative Officer), Jonathan Harries (Draftfcb Global Chief Creative Officer), James Hilton (AKQA Chief Creative Officer), Linus Karlsson (Mother Executive Creative Director), Filip Nilsson (Forsman & Bodenfors Executive Creative Director), Marcello Serpa (AlmapBBDO Chief Creative Officer) and Fernando Vega Olmos (JWT Creative Chairman of Continental Europe and Latam).

In 2012, some of the speakers on stage included artist Niels Shoe Meulman, Bompas & Parr, Sir John Hegarty, Aardman Animation's Peter Lord and Martin Green, the Head of Ceremonies for London 2012.

Young Creatives Competition

The Young Creatives competition provides an opportunity for young advertising and media talent (no older than 28 years) from the region to demonstrate their skills.

Teams of between two and four competitors have 48 hours to create an integrated advertising campaign for a charity or non-profit organisation.

Editions

2008  Stockholm

2009  Amsterdam

2010  Hamburg

2011  Lisbon

2012  Lisbon

2013  Lisbon

2014  Helsinki

2015  Antwerp

2016  Rome

2017  London

References

Advertising awards
Ascential
Festivals in Germany
Recurring events established in 2008
Awards established in 1988
Festivals in Sweden
Festivals in the Netherlands